San Eladio Point is the northwest point of Bryde Island, Danco Coast, Graham Land. Charted by the Argentine Antarctic Expedition, 1949–50, and named "Punta San Eladio" or "Cabo San Eladio" after a staff officer on the expedition ship Chiriguano. An English form of the name has been approved.

Headlands of Graham Land
Danco Coast